Joshua Dolgin (born December 28, 1976), better known by his stage name Socalled, is a Canadian rapper and record producer, known for his eclectic mix of hip hop, klezmer, and other styles such as drum & bass and folk music. A pianist and accordion player, he has taught the latter at Klezfest London, where he has also run workshops in "hiphopkele". He has played with clarinetist David Krakauer's Klezmer Madness!, and has also worked with artists such as rappers C-Rayz Walz, Chilly Gonzales, funk trombonist Fred Wesley, and Sophie Solomon. Dolgin has Ukrainian, Romanian and Russian roots.

Life and career

Dolgin's Socalled collective and guests celebrated the Jewish Festival of Lights with the seasonal concert "Hip Hop Hanukkah" in 2007. He is the subject of The "Socalled" Movie, a documentary released in 2010 by Garry Beitel for the National Film Board of Canada, which also features Krakauer and Wesley. The documentary includes footage of the first "Klezmer Cruise", in which a boatload of klezmer fans sailed down the Dnieper River in Ukraine.

In 2013, his remix of Moe Koffman's "Curried Soul" became the new theme music for CBC Radio One's As It Happens.

His 2011 recording "Work With What You Got" was co-written by and features vocals by calypso legend The Mighty Sparrow.

Discography

Albums
 HiphopKhasene (with Solomon) (2003)
 Consensus: Live in Concert (with Beyond the Pale) (2005)
 The So Called Seder: A Hip Hop Haggadah (2005)
 Ghettoblaster (2007)
 SleepOver (2011)
 The Season (A musical presented during the Pop Montreal festival with Yves Lambert, Katie Moore, Rich Ly, Josh Goldman, Yassin "The Narcicyst" and Josh Dolgin)  (2013)
 Peoplewatching (2015)
 Isaac Babel's Tales From Odessa: A Socalled Yiddish Musical (2017)
 Di Frosh (with Kaiser Quartett) (2018)
 The 2nd Season (2019)

Singles
"(These Are The) Good Old Days" (2007)
"You Are Never Alone" (2007)
"(Rock The) Belz" (2007)

Self
The Socalled Movie (2010)

References

External links 
 Socalled, official site
 The "Socalled" Movie at NFB.ca
 Exclaim.ca September 2007 Interview with Socalled

1976 births
Living people
Anglophone Quebec people
Canadian hip hop record producers
21st-century Canadian rappers
Canadian people of Romanian-Jewish descent
Canadian people of Russian-Jewish descent
Canadian people of Ukrainian-Jewish descent
Canadian gay musicians
Jewish Canadian musicians
Jewish rappers
Klezmer musicians
LGBT Jews
LGBT rappers
Musicians from Montreal
Musicians from Ottawa
Jewish hip hop record producers
Canadian male rappers
Label Bleu artists
21st-century Canadian LGBT people